Carlisle Community School District, also known as the Carlisle Community Schools, is a rural public school district headquartered in Carlisle, Iowa, United States, in Greater Des Moines. The district is located southeast of Downtown Des Moines. It includes the cities of Carlisle, Avon Lake, and Hartford, and it also serves a southeastern portion of the City of Des Moines. The district includes territory in Polk County and Warren County.

History

Around 1979, enrollment in the district was increasing. That year, the Hartford Attendance Center had two fewer classrooms than needed, while the Des Moines Schools were having to close unused schools.

In 2007, the district voted to suspend open enrollment partly in order to ensure that class sizes remained small.

In 2008, the board of directors of the district recommended the establishment of a school foundation. The Empowering Carlisle Community Schools foundation was established.

Schools
Three schools, Carlisle High School (9-12), Carlisle Middle School (6-8), and Carlisle Elementary School (PreK-3) are within the city limits. The high school, the lower elementary school, and the district headquarters are adjacent to one another. Hartford Upper Elementary School (4-5) is not within the City of Carlisle. It is located in Hartford.

Carlisle High School

Athletics 
The Wildcats compete in the Raccoon River Conference in the following sports:

Fall Sports
Cross Country (boys and girls)
Swimming (girls)
Volleyball (girls)
Football

Winter Sports
Basketball (boys and girls)
Wrestling 
Swimming (boys)

Spring Sports
Track and Field (boys and girls)
Golf (boys and girls)
Tennis (boys and girls)
Soccer (girls)
Baseball
 2003 Class 2A State Champions 
Softball
 5-time State Champions (1994, 1996, 1997, 2010, 2019)

See also

List of school districts in Iowa
List of high schools in Iowa

References

External links
Carlisle Community Schools
"Carlisle School District Audit Released." The Carlisle Citizen. Thursday May 31, 2007. Page 6. Google Books 6 of 20.

School districts in Iowa
Education in Des Moines, Iowa
Education in Polk County, Iowa
Education in Warren County, Iowa
Des Moines metropolitan area